The Hong Kong national rugby union team, nicknamed the Dragons, is one of the better rugby sides in Asia outside Japan, and has consistently made the repechages of the Rugby World Cup qualifying. Rugby union in Hong Kong is administered by the Hong Kong Rugby Union since 1952, and competes annually in the Asia Rugby Championship.

Hong Kong has one of the oldest rugby traditions in Asia, having been played there since the 19th century, when British colonists arrived in Hong Kong and brought the sport with them. For a long time, rugby union in Hong Kong was traditionally associated with Hong Kong's British colonial settlers, but since the 1990s there has been extensive efforts to integrate the game with the local Cantonese Chinese community, it included some local born players, with a degree of success; the first of these players being "Rambo" Leung Yeung Kit, considered to be, one of best Hong Kong players during his era. Other players such as Ricky Cheuk and Cado Lee had made significant impact in international tournaments. Hong Kong have having finished second place in the ARC in 2011, 2014, and 2015, and made it to the repechage of the 2015 Rugby World Cup qualifying, though lost to Uruguay 24 to 3.  Hong Kong finished 1st place in the ARC in 2018 and 2019. They again competed in the repechage tournament for the 2019 Rugby World Cup.

History

Early history

According to old newspapers, rugby union in Hong Kong dates back to the late 1870s, which would establish Hong Kong as perhaps the oldest rugby playing nation in Asia. The players during this era were all British sailors and army/navy men, as well as police and merchant men. The first secretary of rugby in Hong Kong was Jock McGregor.

The first fixtures which predate the creation of the modern Hong Kong Rugby Union in 1952 took place from 1924 to 1949. An unofficial interport team from Hong Kong played Shanghai on various dates from 1924 to 1949, both teams being composed entirely of British expatriates living in said port cities; these fixtures ceased after the establishment of Communist rule in mainland China. In 1934, a Hong Kong team played against an Australia Universities team, running out victors 11 to 5.

After the establishment of modern Chinese borders, which before greyed the exact control a union had over territory in China, the Hong Kong Rugby Union was established in 1952; the continuation of British rule in China, as well as the flow of immigrants and capital from the mainland, as well as Hong Kong establishing itself as a major port, allowed the game to flourish, albeit mostly restricted to the white British community.

During this time frame the first official fixtures under the union took place. Hong Kong first received a NZ Universities team in 1958, losing 47 to nil. In 1958, Larry Abel, one of Hong Kong's earliest rugby pioneers, established mini rugby programmes and tournaments, and has been played annually to this day. In 1968, Hong Kong was one of the charter nations of the Asian Rugby Football Union, the others being Japan, Malaysia, Singapore, Sri Lanka, South Korea, and Thailand. Hong Kong won its first official fixture against Japan in 1969, by the score of 24 to 22 in Tokyo.

1970s

During the 1970s Hong Kong played against many of its other Asian neighbors which had a rugby history, these nations being Japan, South Korea, Chinese Taipei, Thailand, Malaysia, Sri Lanka, and Singapore. Hong Kong enjoyed and endured mixed success against its neighbors, finishing second in 1972, only to lose to Japan 16 to nil on home soil.

In 1976, the first ever edition of the Hong Kong Sevens was established, which was pivotal in strengthening the sport in Hong Kong. The concept was discussed by business partners Ian Gow and Tokkie Smith, who wanted to promote a viable rugby product in Asia. The first sponsors of this event were Cathay Pacific and Rothmans International, later replaced by The Hongkong and Shanghai Banking Corporation. The first sides at this competition were Asian, as well as 2 representative sides from Australia and New Zealand. Soon, the competition grew to include teams from around the world before becoming an official part of the Rugby Sevens calendar.

1980s–1990s

During the 1980s, Hong Kong lagged behind Japan and South Korea in terms of competition; Hong Kong was successful against other Asian nations but consistently finished in third place, whereas Japan and South Korea were vying for the top crown. Hong Kong officially joined the IRB in 1988, allowing Hong Kong to compete in the Rugby World Cup, though they did not enter the competition to qualify for 1991.

The 1990s proved to be a much more fruitful decade for Hong Kong. Hong Kong played its first ever test match against a non-Asia-Pacific opponent in 1992, losing 16 to 23 to the United States in 1992 in Boxer Stadium, San Francisco. In the same year, Hong Kong finally broke through and reached the final of the Asia Rugby Championship, beating South Korea 20 to 13 before losing to Japan 9 to 37.

Some notable players during the 1990s represented Hong Kong at the international level including Ashley Billington, David Lewis, Leung Yeung Kit, Chan Fuk Ping and Pieter Schats.

Hong Kong participated in its first qualifying tournament for the Rugby World Cup in 1995, being drawn with Thailand and Singapore in its group. Hong Kong lost its opening fixture to South Korea 28 to 17 before beating its other opponents; Hong Kong therefore missed out on a spot at the 1995 Rugby World Cup. An impressive feat achieved during this campaign though was Ashley Billington's 10 tries versus Singapore on 10 November 1994, which is the most tries ever scored in a Rugby World Cup qualifier by a single player.

Through the 1990s, Hong Kong began organizing tests against non-Asian opponents. Opponents that were played were Namibia, Papua New Guinea, the United States, and Canada. Hong Kong recorded some famous victories, beating the USA Eagles on three occasions in the decade, including a victory in San Francisco, and beating Canada in 1998.

Despite major improvement in the 1990s, Hong Kong bottomed out in its qualifying group for the 1999 Rugby World Cup; Hong Kong beat its nemesis South Korea, but lost to Japan and were upset by the Chinese Taipei; they finished fourth and missed on direct qualification and a repechage.

2000–present: the new millennium

In 2000, Hong Kong made history when they played China in 2000; this was the first test that Hong Kong played against a team from the Chinese mainland since 1949. The game was played in Shanghai to honor the old rugby matches between Hong Kong and Shanghai. China upset Hong Kong 17 to 15 that day.

Hong Kong struggled somewhat during the early 2000s. In 2001, Hong Kong were once again surprised by China, drawing at 25 points each in Guangzhou. Hong Kong were once again upset by the Chinese Taipei in the 2003 Rugby World Cup qualifiers, losing 20 to 15, although Hong Kong beat China for the first time in that same qualification. Hong Kong lost all its fixtures in the final round of the 2007 Rugby World Cup qualifying campaign, missing out again on repechage or qualification.

The 2011 qualifying campaign was similar: Hong Kong beat both South Korea as well as newcomers Kazakhstan, but lost a crucial fixture to the Arabian Gulf; due to bonus points, Kazakhstan advanced instead of Hong Kong to the repechage.

For the 2015 qualifiers, Hong Kong finally broke through. Hong Kong were drawn into a group including its traditional East Asian rivals Japan and South Korea as well as Sri Lanka and newcomers the Philippines. Hong Kong thrashed South Korea 39 to 6 in Hong Kong, as well as recording a resounding 108 to 0 victory over the Philippines. Hong Kong finished second, and qualified for the repechage as a result. In the repechage versus Uruguay, in Montevideo, Hong Kong held firm for the first half, only trailing 6 to 3; however, Hong Kong indiscipline, coupled with key players not being available, meant that Hong Kong collapsed in the second half, losing 28 to 3, and bowing out of the qualifiers.

At the end of 2015, Hong Kong hosted the 2015 Cup of Nations, which included 3 other emerging rugby nations: Portugal, Russia, and Zimbabwe. Hong Kong finished second, beating Portugal and Zimbabwe but losing to Russia. In 2016, Hong Kong hired Leigh Jones, Japan's defense coach who played a key role in Japan's epic upset of South Africa in the 2015 Rugby World Cup, to take the role of head coach and high performance in Hong Kong.

In order to further build for future success, the HKRU, under the vision of Leigh Jones, launched its first fully professional 15s programme called the Elite Rugby Program; the goal of the programme is to encourage domestic players to pursue rugby as a profession in Hong Kong, and long-term, create a professional competition akin to Japan's Top League.

In the 2016 Cup of Nations, Hong Kong lost to Russia and won over Zimbabwe and Papua New Guinea. In the 2017 Cup of Nations, the team was defeated again by Russia, while beating Chile and Kenya.

Hong Kong will participate in the inaugural season of World Series Rugby, facing off against the Western Force.

Overall

Below is table of the representative rugby matches played by a Hong Kong national XV to 23 July 2022.

Tournament history

Rugby World Cup

Asia Rugby Championship

Players

Current squad
On 10 October, Hong Kong named their traveling squad for the 2023 RWC Final Qualification Tournament in Dubai.

Head Coach:  Leigh Jones

Caps updated: 4 November 2022

Records

Most Appearances 

 Nick Hewson – 58
 David Lewis – 55
 Rowan Varty – 42

Notable former players

The Hong Kong Rugby Union has inducted 16 players into its Hall of Fame as part of its Roll of Honour. Some of these players include;
Ashley Billington, wing who holds the record for most tries scored in an international match.

Past Coaches

 1 Hammond appointed head coach in April 2021 but left 2 months later to return back to the UK. He was subsequently replaced by Armor as interim coach ahead of the 2021 Asian Rugby Championship, which was later cancelled due to the COVID-19 pandemic, leading to Armor's abrupt departure.

See also

Rugby union in Hong Kong
Hong Kong Sevens
Hong Kong national rugby sevens team
Hong Kong national under-20 rugby union team
Hong Kong women's national rugby union team
Hong Kong women's national rugby sevens team
List of Hong Kong national rugby union players

References

External links
Hong Kong Rugby Union Homepage
Hong Kong Sevens
Facebook Page

 
Asian national rugby union teams
Rugby union in Hong Kong
Hong Kong rugby union teams